Rabbi Elimelech Szapira of Grodzhisk (1823–1892) was the leading Hasidic rebbe of his time in Poland. After the death of his father, the  Sorof of Mogelnica, he assumed leadership of the Grodzhisk chasidim, who eventually numbered in the tens of thousands.

His sons-in-law were the Kozhnitser Rebbe Yaakov Yechiel Hopsztajn and Rebbe Osher the Second of Stolin-Karlin.

When he died, his surviving sons were aged two and three, the sons from his first marriage having predeceased him. Some of the chassidim waited for the sons to grow up; one eventually became the Piasetzner Rov. Other chassidim chose a grandson, Rabbi Yisroel Shapira as their next leader. A third group, including many learned rabbis, followed the scholarly Ostrovtser Rov. This led to the common epithet that when the Imrei Elimelech died, his main successors were the Rebbe fun der Daies (Rebbe of the opinions, the Ostrovtzer,) the Rebbe fun der Maiyes (Rebbe of the hundreds, a polite way of saying the wealthy Chassidim; his grandson, Rabbi Yisroel Shapira,) and the Rebbe fun der peiyes (Rebbe of the sidecurls, that is to say, the most intensely religious chassidim.) His youngest son, Yeshaya Shapira, became a rabbi but did not establish his own court, instead focusing on religious Zionism as an early leader in Hapoel HaMizrachi.

Writings
The teachings of the Grodzhikser Rebbe are collected in Imrei Elimelech and Divrei Elimelech.

References

External links
 Imrei Elimelech

1823 births
1892 deaths
Hasidic rebbes
Polish Hasidic rabbis
Kozhnitz (Hasidic dynasty)